Harlan Francis Hagen (October 8, 1914 – November 25, 1990) was an American lawyer and World War II veteran who served as a United States representative from California. A member of the Democratic Party, he served in the U.S. House of Representatives from 1953 to 1967, representing the 14th and 18th districts of California.

Early life and education
Born in Lawton, North Dakota, Hagen graduated from Long Beach Polytechnic High School in Long Beach, California. He went on to graduate from Long Beach City College in 1933 and from the University of California, Berkeley with an A.B. degree in 1936. In 1940, he received an L.L.B. from Berkeley.

After receiving his law degree, Hagen entered the private practice of law. During World War II, he served in the U.S. Army from 1943 to 1946.

Political career
Hagen was elected to the city council of Hanford, California in 1948. Later that year, he was elected to the California State Assembly where he served from 1949 to 1952.

Congress
In 1952, Hagen was elected to the 83rd Congress as a Democrat, defeating Republican Congressman Thomas Werdel with 51% of the vote.  He went on to serve seven terms in the House of Representatives, from January 3, 1953 to January 3, 1967.

Hagen was defeated for reelection in 1966 by the Republican candidate, Bob Mathias, by a margin of 55.9% to 44.1% in what was by then designated as the 18th District. He tried to win the seat back from Mathias in 1968 but was again defeated, receiving only 33.4% of the vote.

Death
Hagen died on November 25, 1990 in Hanford, California.

References

1914 births
1990 deaths
Democratic Party members of the United States House of Representatives from California
People from Ramsey County, North Dakota
University of California, Berkeley administrators
California city council members
United States Army personnel of World War II
Democratic Party members of the California State Assembly
People from Hanford, California
20th-century American politicians
Long Beach Polytechnic High School alumni
20th-century American academics